Pilsley is a small village and civil parish in Derbyshire, England. At the 2011 Census the population of the civil parish was 152.  It is close to Chatsworth and most of it belongs to the Chatsworth House estate.

The village
The village has a primary school which was built by Joseph Paxton and extended in 1950 (kitchen), 1969, 1998 and 2002. Many of the pupils are the children of Chatsworth estate employees. The Wesleyan Chapel was converted into a computer room for the school in 2004. There is also a pub and a post office.

Pilsley is also the location of the Chatsworth Farm Shop, a business selling estate and  British produce, which was established in the former shire horse stables in 1977 and was employing more than 100 people in 2005. A 90-seat restaurant was added in 2004.

See also
Beeley – another Chatsworth estate village
Edensor – also a Chatsworth estate village

References

External links

Illustrated Pilsley page from Discover Derbyshire
Ofsted report on Pilsley School, 1999

Villages in Derbyshire
Towns and villages of the Peak District
Derbyshire Dales